

Offseason
 October 11, 1989: Steve Stanicek was released by the Phillies.
 December 4, 1989: Rule 5 draft
Sil Campusano was drafted by the Phillies from the Toronto Blue Jays.
Gordon Dillard was drafted from the Phillies by the Pittsburgh Pirates.
 December 6, 1989: Steve Lake was signed as a free agent by the Phillies.
 March 31, 1990: Steve Jeltz was traded by the Phillies to the Kansas City Royals for José DeJesús.

Regular season

Terry Mulholland pitched the eighth no-hitter of the 1990 season on August 15 as the Phillies beat the San Francisco Giants, 6–0. The season's eighth no-hitter surpassed the modern record of seven set in 1917 and 1908. Mulholland's no-hitter was the first in the 20th century by a Phillies' pitcher in Philadelphia, and was also the first nine-inning no-hitter pitched at Veterans Stadium. The game was played in two hours and nine minutes and attendance was 32,156.

Season standings

Record vs. opponents

Notable transactions

 April 6, 1990: Dickie Noles was signed as a free agent by the Phillies.
 June 4, 1990: 1990 Major League Baseball draft
Mike Lieberthal was drafted by the Phillies in the 1st round.
Marvin Benard was drafted by the Phillies in the 20th round, but did not sign.
 July 23, 1990: Marvin Freeman was traded by the Phillies to the Atlanta Braves for Joe Boever.
 August 3, 1990: Jeff Parrett and players to be named later were traded by the Phillies to the Atlanta Braves for Dale Murphy and a player to be named later. The Braves completed their part of the deal by sending Tommy Greene to the Phillies on August 9. The Phillies completed the deal by sending Jim Vatcher to the Braves on August 9 and Víctor Rosario to the Braves on September 4.

1990 Game Log

|- style="background:#fbb"
| 1 || April 10 || @ Cubs || 1–2 || Les Lancaster (1–0) || Jeff Parrett (0–1) || Mitch Williams (1) || 7,791 || 0–1
|- style="background:#bbb"
| – || April 11 || @ Cubs || colspan=6 | Postponed (rain); Makeup: April 12 as a traditional double-header
|- style="background:#bfb"
| 2 || April 12 (1) || @ Cubs || 5–4 || Terry Mulholland (1–0) || Steve Wilson (0–1) || Roger McDowell (1) || see 2nd game || 1–1
|- style="background:#fbb"
| 3 || April 12 (2) || @ Cubs || 3–6 || José Núñez (1–0) || Pat Combs (0–1) || Mitch Williams (2) || 7,717 || 1–2
|- style="background:#fbb"
| 4 || April 13 || Cardinals || 0–11 || John Tudor (1–0) || Ken Howell (0–1) || Bob Tewksbury (1) || 32,173 || 1–3
|- style="background:#bfb"
| 5 || April 14 || Cardinals || 6–2 || Bruce Ruffin (1–0) || Joe Magrane (0–1) || Jeff Parrett (1) || 15,613 || 2–3
|- style="background:#bfb"
| 6 || April 15 || Cardinals || 4–0 || Dennis Cook (1–0) || Bryn Smith (1–1) || Roger McDowell (2) || 14,435 || 3–3
|- style="background:#fbb"
| 7 || April 16 || @ Expos || 4–5 || Joe Hesketh (1–0) || Jeff Parrett (0–2) || Steve Frey (2) || 11,063 || 3–4
|- style="background:#fbb"
| 8 || April 17 || @ Expos || 1–2 || Drew Hall (1–1) || Todd Frohwirth (0–1) || Steve Frey (3) || 8,406 || 3–5
|- style="background:#bfb"
| 9 || April 18 || @ Expos || 4–3 || Ken Howell (1–1) || Kevin Gross (0–1) || Roger McDowell (3) || 10,096 || 4–5
|- style="background:#fbb"
| 10 || April 19 || Expos || 0–5 || Dennis Martínez (2–0) || Bruce Ruffin (1–1) || None || 8,417 || 4–6
|- style="background:#bfb"
| 11 || April 20 || @ Cardinals || 3–0 || Dennis Cook (2–0) || Bryn Smith (1–2) || None || 29,343 || 5–6
|- style="background:#bfb"
| 12 || April 21 || @ Cardinals || 7–6 (10) || Roger McDowell (1–0) || Scott Terry (0–1) || None || 39,798 || 6–6
|- style="background:#bfb"
| 13 || April 22 || @ Cardinals || 5–3 || Pat Combs (1–1) || Ricky Horton (0–1) || Roger McDowell (4) || 36,819 || 7–6
|- style="background:#bfb"
| 14 || April 24 || Reds || 6–3 || Ken Howell (2–1) || José Rijo (0–1) || Roger McDowell (5) || 19,161 || 8–6
|- style="background:#fbb"
| 15 || April 25 || Reds || 7–12 || Rick Mahler (1–0) || Bruce Ruffin (1–2) || None || 18,497 || 8–7
|- style="background:#bfb"
| 16 || April 27 || @ Braves || 7–1 || Dennis Cook (3–0) || Mike Stanton (0–3) || None || 12,598 || 9–7
|- style="background:#bfb"
| 17 || April 28 || @ Braves || 2–1 || Jeff Parrett (1–2) || Joe Boever (0–1) || Roger McDowell (6) || 12,659 || 10–7
|- style="background:#fbb"
| 18 || April 29 || @ Braves || 1–3 || Pete Smith (2–1) || Pat Combs (1–2) || None || 11,966 || 10–8
|- style="background:#fbb"
| 19 || April 30 || @ Reds || 2–6 || José Rijo (1–1) || Ken Howell (2–2) || Rob Dibble (3) || 17,294 || 10–9
|-

|- style="background:#bfb"
| 20 || May 1 || @ Reds || 4–2 || Bruce Ruffin (2–2) || Tim Birtsas (1–1) || Roger McDowell (7) || 16,926 || 11–9
|- style="background:#bfb"
| 21 || May 2 || Astros || 14–4 || Dennis Cook (4–0) || Jim Clancy (1–1) || None || 15,196 || 12–9
|- style="background:#fbb"
| 22 || May 3 || Astros || 3–10 || Bill Gullickson (2–1) || Terry Mulholland (1–1) || Dave Smith (8) || 13,653 || 12–10
|- style="background:#bfb"
| 23 || May 4 || Dodgers || 8–3 || Don Carman (1–0) || Ramón Martínez (2–1) || None || 8,926 || 13–10
|- style="background:#fbb"
| 24 || May 5 || Dodgers || 0–3 || Mike Morgan (4–1) || Ken Howell (2–3) || None || 25,290 || 13–11
|- style="background:#bfb"
| 25 || May 6 || Dodgers || 9–5 || Don Carman (2–0) || Mike Munoz (0–1) || None || 38,167 || 14–11
|- style="background:#fbb"
| 26 || May 8 || @ Astros || 2–3 (10) || Dave Smith (1–2) || Dickie Noles (0–1) || None || 12,909 || 14–12
|- style="background:#bfb"
| 27 || May 9 || @ Astros || 10–1 || Pat Combs (2–2) || Mike Scott (1–3) || None || 11,257 || 15–12
|- style="background:#bfb"
| 28 || May 11 || Giants || 10–6 || Ken Howell (3–3) || John Burkett (2–1) || None || 26,750 || 16–12
|- style="background:#fbb"
| 29 || May 12 || Giants || 2–6 || Scott Garrelts (1–3) || Bruce Ruffin (2–3) || Jeff Brantley (3) || 24,272 || 16–13
|- style="background:#bfb"
| 30 || May 13 || Giants || 4–1 || Dennis Cook (5–0) || Rick Reuschel (2–4) || None || 19,631 || 17–13
|- style="background:#fbb"
| 31 || May 14 || @ Padres || 1–5 || Andy Benes (3–3) || Pat Combs (2–3) || None || 16,389 || 17–14
|- style="background:#bfb"
| 32 || May 15 || @ Padres || 2–1 || Terry Mulholland (2–1) || Dennis Rasmussen (3–2) || Roger McDowell (8) || 22,596 || 18–14
|- style="background:#bfb"
| 33 || May 16 || @ Padres || 6–5 || Ken Howell (4–3) || Ed Whitson (3–2) || Roger McDowell (9) || 17,710 || 19–14
|- style="background:#fbb"
| 34 || May 18 || @ Dodgers || 2–4 || Tim Belcher (3–3) || Bruce Ruffin (2–4) || Jay Howell (1) || 34,274 || 19–15
|- style="background:#bfb"
| 35 || May 19 || @ Dodgers || 15–12 (11) || Roger McDowell (2–0) || Jay Howell (1–2) || None || 44,703 || 20–15
|- style="background:#fbb"
| 36 || May 20 || @ Dodgers || 3–6 || Ramón Martínez (4–2) || Pat Combs (2–4) || Mike Hartley (1) || 45,770 || 20–16
|- style="background:#bfb"
| 37 || May 21 || @ Giants || 5–2 || Terry Mulholland (3–1) || Scott Garrelts (1–4) || Roger McDowell (10) || 11,263 || 21–16
|- style="background:#bfb"
| 38 || May 22 || @ Giants || 4–2 || Ken Howell (5–3) || Rick Reuschel (2–5) || Roger McDowell (11) || 8,799 || 22–16
|- style="background:#bfb"
| 39 || May 24 || Braves || 8–4 || Bruce Ruffin (3–4) || Marty Clary (1–3) || Marvin Freeman (1) || 21,160 || 23–16
|- style="background:#bfb"
| 40 || May 25 || Braves || 5–4 || Jeff Parrett (2–2) || Joe Hesketh (1–1) || Roger McDowell (12) || 22,162 || 24–16
|- style="background:#fbb"
| 41 || May 26 || Braves || 3–12 || Pete Smith (4–3) || Pat Combs (2–5) || None || 56,789 || 24–17
|- style="background:#fbb"
| 42 || May 27 || Braves || 1–6 || John Smoltz (3–4) || Terry Mulholland (3–2) || None || 27,139 || 24–18
|- style="background:#fbb"
| 43 || May 28 || Padres || 5–9 || Mark Grant (1–0) || Jeff Parrett (2–3) || None || 18,390 || 24–19
|- style="background:#bbb"
| – || May 29 || Padres || colspan=6 | Postponed (rain); Makeup: September 1 as a traditional double-header
|- style="background:#fbb"
| 44 || May 30 || Padres || 3–8 || Andy Benes (5–4) || Bruce Ruffin (3–5) || Greg W. Harris (2) || 21,375 || 24–20
|-

|- style="background:#fbb"
| 45 || June 1 || Mets || 0–4 || Frank Viola (8–2) || Dennis Cook (5–1) || None || 34,457 || 24–21
|- style="background:#bfb"
| 46 || June 2 || Mets || 5–4 || Ken Howell (6–3) || Dwight Gooden (3–5) || Roger McDowell (13) || 41,950 || 25–21
|- style="background:#bfb"
| 47 || June 3 || Mets || 8–3 || Pat Combs (3–5) || Sid Fernandez (3–5) || None || 43,643 || 26–21
|- style="background:#fbb"
| 48 || June 4 || @ Cardinals || 2–3 (11) || Frank DiPino (2–0) || Marvin Freeman (0–1) || None || 29,937 || 26–22
|- style="background:#bfb"
| 49 || June 5 || @ Cardinals || 9–6 || Don Carman (3–0) || Scott Terry (0–4) || None || 26,522 || 27–22
|- style="background:#fbb"
| 50 || June 6 || @ Cardinals || 11–12 (10) || Frank DiPino (3–0) || Roger McDowell (2–1) || None || 28,319 || 27–23
|- style="background:#bfb"
| 51 || June 7 || @ Cubs || 3–1 || Ken Howell (7–3) || Mike Bielecki (3–4) || None || 29,271 || 28–23
|- style="background:#fbb"
| 52 || June 8 || @ Cubs || 2–15 || Jeff Pico (2–0) || Terry Mulholland (3–3) || None || 32,219 || 28–24
|- style="background:#fbb"
| 53 || June 9 || @ Cubs || 3–4 (11) || Les Lancaster (5–2) || Jeff Parrett (2–4) || None || 33,266 || 28–25
|- style="background:#fbb"
| 54 || June 10 || @ Cubs || 3–7 || Steve Wilson (1–4) || Bruce Ruffin (3–6) || Les Lancaster (2) || 32,187 || 28–26
|- style="background:#fbb"
| 55 || June 11 (1) || Expos || 0–5 || Kevin Gross (8–4) || Dennis Cook (5–2) || None || see 2nd game || 28–27
|- style="background:#fbb"
| 56 || June 11 (2) || Expos || 2–3 || Drew Hall (4–6) || Jeff Parrett (2–5) || Dave Schmidt (5) || 22,700 || 28–28
|- style="background:#bfb"
| 57 || June 12 || Expos || 7–2 || Ken Howell (8–3) || Zane Smith (3–4) || None || 19,169 || 29–28
|- style="background:#fbb"
| 58 || June 13 || Expos || 3–4 (10) || Dave Schmidt (2–0) || Roger McDowell (2–2) || Drew Hall (3) || 18,655 || 29–29
|- style="background:#bbb"
| – || June 14 || Cubs || colspan=6 | Postponed (rain); Makeup: June 15 as a traditional double-header
|- style="background:#bfb"
| 59 || June 15 (1) || Cubs || 6–5 (10) || Darrel Akerfelds (1–0) || José Núñez (1–5) || None || see 2nd game || 30–29
|- style="background:#bfb"
| 60 || June 15 (2) || Cubs || 7–0 || Bruce Ruffin (4–6) || Mike Bielecki (3–6) || None || 26,098 || 31–29
|- style="background:#bfb"
| 61 || June 16 || Cubs || 2–1 || Darrel Akerfelds (2–0) || Greg Maddux (4–7) || None || 32,023 || 32–29
|- style="background:#fbb"
| 62 || June 17 || Cubs || 3–5 || Jeff Pico (3–0) || Jeff Parrett (2–6) || Les Lancaster (3) || 30,338 || 32–30
|- style="background:#bbb"
| – || June 18 || Pirates || colspan=6 | Postponed (rain); Makeup: August 6 as a traditional double-header
|- style="background:#bfb"
| 63 || June 19 || Pirates || 2–1 (10) || Don Carman (4–0) || Bill Landrum (2–1) || None || 29,781 || 33–30
|- style="background:#bfb"
| 64 || June 20 || Pirates || 7–2 || Bruce Ruffin (5–6) || Bob Patterson (4–3) || None || 40,256 || 34–30
|- style="background:#fbb"
| 65 || June 22 || @ Mets || 1–5 || Frank Viola (10–3) || Ken Howell (8–4) || None || 43,587 || 34–31
|- style="background:#fbb"
| 66 || June 23 || @ Mets || 0–3 || Dwight Gooden (6–5) || Pat Combs (3–6) || None || 45,661 || 34–32
|- style="background:#fbb"
| 67 || June 24 || @ Mets || 5–6 || Jeff Innis (1–1) || Roger McDowell (2–3) || None || 47,836 || 34–33
|- style="background:#fbb"
| 68 || June 25 || @ Pirates || 0–5 || Rick Reed (1–0) || José DeJesús (0–1) || None || 29,369 || 34–34
|- style="background:#fbb"
| 69 || June 26 || @ Pirates || 0–1 || Scott Ruskin (2–1) || Bruce Ruffin (5–7) || Stan Belinda (2) || 25,807 || 34–35
|- style="background:#fbb"
| 70 || June 27 || @ Pirates || 3–5 || Bob Kipper (2–1) || Ken Howell (8–5) || Bill Landrum (11) || 40,207 || 34–36
|- style="background:#bfb"
| 71 || June 29 || Astros || 2–0 || Pat Combs (4–6) || Bill Gullickson (5–6) || None || 26,339 || 35–36
|- style="background:#fbb"
| 72 || June 30 || Astros || 3–8 || Mike Scott (6–7) || Marvin Freeman (0–2) || Juan Agosto (1) || 27,111 || 35–37
|-

|- style="background:#bfb"
| 73 || July 1 || Astros || 8–4 || Roger McDowell (3–3) || Larry Andersen (4–2) || None || 27,014 || 36–37
|- style="background:#bfb"
| 74 || July 2 || Astros || 5–1 || Bruce Ruffin (6–7) || Jim Deshaies (4–6) || Darrel Akerfelds (1) || 32,349 || 37–37
|- style="background:#bfb"
| 75 || July 3 || Braves || 5–1 || Jeff Parrett (3–6) || Marty Clary (1–4) || Dennis Cook (1) || 55,147 || 38–37
|- style="background:#fbb"
| 76 || July 4 || Braves || 1–4 || Tom Glavine (5–5) || Pat Combs (4–7) || Joe Boever (8) || 18,286 || 38–38
|- style="background:#fbb"
| 77 || July 5 || Reds || 2–9 || Jack Armstrong (11–3) || Ken Howell (8–6) || None || 19,961 || 38–39
|- style="background:#fbb"
| 78 || July 6 || Reds || 1–4 || Danny Jackson (3–2) || José DeJesús (0–2) || Randy Myers (17) || 28,501 || 38–40
|- style="background:#fbb"
| 79 || July 7 || Reds || 0–5 || Rick Mahler (3–3) || Bruce Ruffin (6–8) || None || 29,515 || 38–41
|- style="background:#bfb"
| 80 || July 8 || Reds || 4–3 || Darrel Akerfelds (3–0) || Norm Charlton (6–3) || None || 31,602 || 39–41
|- style="background:#bbcaff;"
| – || July 10 ||colspan="7" |1990 Major League Baseball All-Star Game at Wrigley Field in Chicago
|- style="background:#fbb"
| 81 || July 12 || @ Astros || 4–7 || Bill Gullickson (6–6) || Bruce Ruffin (6–9) || Dave Smith (17) || 16,983 || 39–42
|- style="background:#bfb"
| 82 || July 13 || @ Astros || 4–2 || José DeJesús (1–2) || Mike Scott (6–9) || Darrel Akerfelds (2) || 15,248 || 40–42
|- style="background:#bfb"
| 83 || July 14 || @ Astros || 12–8 || Pat Combs (5–7) || Jim Deshaies (4–8) || None || 28,308 || 41–42
|- style="background:#fbb"
| 84 || July 15 || @ Astros || 1–6 || Danny Darwin (3–1) || Jeff Parrett (3–7) || None || 19,616 || 41–43
|- style="background:#bfb"
| 85 || July 16 || @ Braves || 7–2 || Terry Mulholland (4–3) || Marty Clary (1–6) || None || 8,211 || 42–43
|- style="background:#fbb"
| 86 || July 17 || @ Braves || 10–14 || Tom Glavine (6–6) || Bruce Ruffin (6–10) || Kent Mercker (1) || 8,558 || 42–44
|- style="background:#bfb"
| 87 || July 18 || @ Braves || 4–3 || Dennis Cook (6–2) || John Smoltz (6–7) || Darrel Akerfelds (3) || 8,706 || 43–44
|- style="background:#bfb"
| 88 || July 19 || @ Reds || 5–2 || Pat Combs (6–7) || Jack Armstrong (11–5) || Roger McDowell (14) || 37,163 || 44–44
|- style="background:#fbb"
| 89 || July 20 || @ Reds || 1–5 || Norm Charlton (8–4) || Jeff Parrett (3–8) || Rob Dibble (8) || 39,394 || 44–45
|- style="background:#fbb"
| 90 || July 21 || @ Reds || 1–6 || José Rijo (6–3) || Terry Mulholland (4–4) || Rick Mahler (2) || 34,506 || 44–46
|- style="background:#bfb"
| 91 || July 22 || @ Reds || 6–2 || José DeJesús (2–2) || Scott Scudder (2–3) || None || 33,658 || 45–46
|- style="background:#bfb"
| 92 || July 23 || Mets || 7–4 || Darrel Akerfelds (4–0) || Frank Viola (13–5) || Roger McDowell (15) || 39,260 || 46–46
|- style="background:#fbb"
| 93 || July 24 || Mets || 4–7 || Julio Machado (3–1) || Roger McDowell (3–4) || John Franco (22) || 43,235 || 46–47
|- style="background:#fbb"
| 94 || July 25 || Mets || 9–10 || Sid Fernandez (7–6) || Jeff Parrett (3–9) || John Franco (23) || 40,079 || 46–48
|- style="background:#bfb"
| 95 || July 26 || @ Pirates || 12–4 || Terry Mulholland (5–4) || Neal Heaton (10–7) || None || 24,088 || 47–48
|- style="background:#bfb"
| 96 || July 27 || @ Pirates || 5–3 || Dennis Cook (7–2) || Rick Reed (2–2) || Joe Boever (9) || 29,117 || 48–48
|- style="background:#bfb"
| 97 || July 28 || @ Pirates || 4–3 || Jeff Parrett (4–9) || Bill Landrum (3–2) || Joe Boever (10) || 37,022 || 49–48
|- style="background:#fbb"
| 98 || July 29 || @ Pirates || 1–2 || Doug Drabek (13–4) || Pat Combs (6–8) || None || 33,018 || 49–49
|- style="background:#fbb"
| 99 || July 31 || Cardinals || 2–4 || John Tudor (10–3) || Ken Howell (8–7) || Lee Smith (21) || 25,463 || 49–50
|-

|- style="background:#bfb"
| 100 || August 1 || Cardinals || 11–10 || Terry Mulholland (6–4) || Ken Hill (1–1) || Roger McDowell (16) || 23,142 || 50–50
|- style="background:#fbb"
| 101 || August 2 || Cardinals || 3–4 || Bob Tewksbury (6–3) || José DeJesús (2–3) || Lee Smith (22) || 21,898 || 50–51
|- style="background:#fbb"
| 102 || August 3 || Pirates || 0–11 || Doug Drabek (14–4) || Bruce Ruffin (6–11) || None || 36,057 || 50–52
|- style="background:#fbb"
| 103 || August 4 || Pirates || 1–3 (10) || Bob Patterson (8–3) || Roger McDowell (3–5) || Ted Power (6) || 45,305 || 50–53
|- style="background:#bfb"
| 104 || August 5 || Pirates || 8–6 || Don Carman (5–0) || Scott Ruskin (2–2) || Joe Boever (11) || 40,142 || 51–53
|- style="background:#fbb"
| 105 || August 6 (1) || Pirates || 1–10 || Randy Tomlin (1–0) || Terry Mulholland (6–5) || None || see 2nd game || 51–54
|- style="background:#fbb"
| 106 || August 6 (2) || Pirates || 3–4 (10) || Bill Landrum (4–2) || Roger McDowell (3–6) || None || 30,827 || 51–55
|- style="background:#bfb"
| 107 || August 7 || @ Mets || 9–0 || José DeJesús (3–3) || Frank Viola (15–6) || None || 33,120 || 52–55
|- style="background:#fbb"
| 108 || August 8 || @ Mets || 4–8 || David Cone (8–5) || Don Carman (5–1) || None || 41,204 || 52–56
|- style="background:#fbb"
| 109 || August 9 || @ Mets || 4–5 || Bob Ojeda (6–5) || Darrel Akerfelds (4–1) || John Franco (25) || 39,240 || 52–57
|- style="background:#fbb"
| 110 || August 10 || @ Expos || 3–4 || Oil Can Boyd (7–4) || Terry Mulholland (6–6) || Steve Frey (5) || 17,904 || 52–58
|- style="background:#fbb"
| 111 || August 11 || @ Expos || 4–5 (12) || Bill Sampen (9–4) || Don Carman (5–2) || None || 23,708 || 52–59
|- style="background:#fbb"
| 112 || August 12 || @ Expos || 3–6 || Chris Nabholz (1–0) || José DeJesús (3–4) || Tim Burke (14) || 29,186 || 52–60
|- style="background:#bfb"
| 113 || August 14 || Giants || 4–3 (13) || Dennis Cook (8–2) || Steve Bedrosian (5–7) || None || 29,538 || 53–60
|- style="background:#bfb"
| 114 || August 15 || Giants || 6–0 || Terry Mulholland (7–6) || Don Robinson (8–4) || None || 32,156 || 54–60
|- style="background:#bfb"
| 115 || August 16 || Giants || 6–4 || Roger McDowell (4–6) || Mark Thurmond (2–3) || None || 37,340 || 55–60
|- style="background:#bfb"
| 116 || August 17 || @ Padres || 2–1 || José DeJesús (4–4) || Calvin Schiraldi (3–5) || None || 18,488 || 56–60
|- style="background:#fbb"
| 117 || August 18 || @ Padres || 2–4 || Andy Benes (9–8) || Tommy Greene (1–1) || Craig Lefferts (19) || 35,145 || 56–61
|- style="background:#bfb"
| 118 || August 19 || @ Padres || 3–2 || Joe Boever (2–3) || Dennis Rasmussen (8–12) || Roger McDowell (17) || 22,627 || 57–61
|- style="background:#fbb"
| 119 || August 20 || @ Dodgers || 1–2 || Jim Gott (1–2) || Terry Mulholland (7–7) || None || 28,112 || 57–62
|- style="background:#bfb"
| 120 || August 21 || @ Dodgers || 12–11 || Roger McDowell (5–6) || Tim Crews (1–4) || Don Carman (1) || 39,682 || 58–62
|- style="background:#fbb"
| 121 || August 22 || @ Dodgers || 2–3 || Jim Gott (2–2) || Joe Boever (2–4) || None || 27,934 || 58–63
|- style="background:#fbb"
| 122 || August 23 || @ Giants || 3–6 || Francisco Oliveras (1–2) || Dennis Cook (8–3) || Steve Bedrosian (9) || 13,918 || 58–64
|- style="background:#fbb"
| 123 || August 24 || @ Giants || 2–13 || Mike LaCoss (4–2) || Pat Combs (6–9) || None || 15,961 || 58–65
|- style="background:#fbb"
| 124 || August 25 || @ Giants || 2–4 || Don Robinson (10–4) || Terry Mulholland (7–8) || Jeff Brantley (18) || 28,208 || 58–66
|- style="background:#bfb"
| 125 || August 26 || @ Giants || 5–1 || Jason Grimsley (1–0) || John Burkett (11–5) || None || 30,208 || 59–66
|- style="background:#fbb"
| 126 || August 28 || Dodgers || 1–5 || Jim Neidlinger (3–1) || José DeJesús (4–5) || None || 24,296 || 59–67
|- style="background:#fbb"
| 127 || August 29 || Dodgers || 2–12 || Fernando Valenzuela (12–10) || Tommy Greene (1–2) || Tim Crews (5) || 18,545 || 59–68
|- style="background:#fbb"
| 128 || August 30 || Dodgers || 2–3 || Ramón Martínez (16–6) || Joe Boever (2–5) || Dave Walsh (1) || 24,160 || 59–69
|- style="background:#bfb"
| 129 || August 31 || Padres || 4–2 || Roger McDowell (6–6) || Atlee Hammaker (4–6) || None || 23,286 || 60–69
|-

|- style="background:#bfb"
| 130 || September 1 (1) || Padres || 3–2 (10) || Joe Boever (3–5) || Greg W. Harris (7–7) || None || see 2nd game || 61–69
|- style="background:#bfb"
| 131 || September 1 (2) || Padres || 2–1 || Darrel Akerfelds (5–1) || Rich Rodriguez (1–1) || Roger McDowell (18) || 25,008 || 62–69
|- style="background:#fbb"
| 132 || September 2 || Padres || 1–9 || Ed Whitson (12–7) || José DeJesús (4–6) || None || 33,498 || 62–70
|- style="background:#fbb"
| 133 || September 3 || @ Pirates || 1–4 || Doug Drabek (18–5) || Bruce Ruffin (6–12) || None || 23,854 || 62–71
|- style="background:#fbb"
| 134 || September 4 || @ Pirates || 7–11 || Bill Landrum (5–3) || Darrel Akerfelds (5–2) || Bob Patterson (4) || 16,858 || 62–72
|- style="background:#bfb"
| 135 || September 5 || Cubs || 4–1 || Terry Mulholland (8–8) || Steve Wilson (4–8) || Roger McDowell (19) || 16,177 || 63–72
|- style="background:#fbb"
| 136 || September 6 || Cubs || 2–5 || José Núñez (2–6) || Jason Grimsley (1–1) || Mitch Williams (14) || 13,849 || 63–73
|- style="background:#bfb"
| 137 || September 7 || Mets || 4–1 || José DeJesús (5–6) || David Cone (11–8) || None || 29,744 || 64–73
|- style="background:#fbb"
| 138 || September 8 || Mets || 2–12 || Dwight Gooden (16–6) || Bruce Ruffin (6–13) || None || 37,489 || 64–74
|- style="background:#bfb"
| 139 || September 9 || Mets || 6–2 || Pat Combs (7–9) || Sid Fernandez (9–12) || Joe Boever (12) || 36,502 || 65–74
|- style="background:#fbb"
| 140 || September 10 || Pirates || 2–3 || Stan Belinda (3–4) || Joe Boever (3–6) || None || 18,970 || 65–75
|- style="background:#fbb"
| 141 || September 11 || Pirates || 1–5 || Randy Tomlin (3–2) || Jason Grimsley (1–2) || None || 20,289 || 65–76
|- style="background:#fbb"
| 142 || September 12 || @ Cubs || 3–9 || Greg Maddux (13–13) || José DeJesús (5–7) || None || 16,258 || 65–77
|- style="background:#fbb"
| 143 || September 13 || @ Cubs || 5–6 || Paul Assenmacher (5–2) || Roger McDowell (6–7) || Les Lancaster (6) || 15,495 || 65–78
|- style="background:#bfb"
| 144 || September 14 || @ Mets || 4–1 || Pat Combs (8–9) || Sid Fernandez (9–13) || None || 36,339 || 66–78
|- style="background:#fbb"
| 145 || September 15 || @ Mets || 2–4 || Frank Viola (19–9) || Terry Mulholland (8–9) || John Franco (33) || 45,202 || 66–79
|- style="background:#bfb"
| 146 || September 16 || @ Mets || 8–3 || José DeJesús (6–7) || David Cone (12–9) || None || 44,813 || 67–79
|- style="background:#bfb"
| 147 || September 18 || @ Cardinals || 6–3 || Jason Grimsley (2–2) || Bob Tewksbury (10–7) || Joe Boever (13) || 15,588 || 68–79
|- style="background:#bfb"
| 148 || September 19 || @ Cardinals || 8–4 || Pat Combs (9–9) || Joe Magrane (9–16) || None || 15,828 || 69–79
|- style="background:#fbb"
| 149 || September 20 || @ Cardinals || 4–5 || Mike Pérez (1–0) || Roger McDowell (6–8) || None || 14,744 || 69–80
|- style="background:#bfb"
| 150 || September 21 || Expos || 5–4 (12) || Chuck Malone (1–0) || Bill Sampen (11–7) || None || 23,274 || 70–80
|- style="background:#bfb"
| 151 || September 22 || Expos || 3–2 || Tommy Greene (2–2) || Scott Anderson (0–1) || Roger McDowell (20) || 17,215 || 71–80
|- style="background:#bfb"
| 152 || September 23 || Expos || 2–1 (16) || Don Carman (6–2) || Howard Farmer (0–3) || None || 25,715 || 72–80
|- style="background:#bfb"
| 153 || September 24 || Expos || 3–0 || Pat Combs (10–9) || Brian Barnes (0–1) || None || 11,527 || 73–80
|- style="background:#fbb"
| 154 || September 25 || Cardinals || 0–1 || Joe Magrane (10–16) || Terry Mulholland (8–10) || Ken Dayley (2) || 13,615 || 73–81
|- style="background:#fbb"
| 155 || September 26 || Cardinals || 1–8 || Bryn Smith (9–8) || José DeJesús (6–8) || None || 12,443 || 73–82
|- style="background:#bfb"
| 156 || September 27 || Cardinals || 4–3 || Tommy Greene (3–2) || José DeLeón (7–19) || Joe Boever (14) || 9,119 || 74–82
|- style="background:#bfb"
| 157 || September 28 || @ Expos || 5–4 || Jason Grimsley (3–2) || Oil Can Boyd (10–6) || Roger McDowell (21) || 8,230 || 75–82
|- style="background:#fbb"
| 158 || September 29 || @ Expos || 1–5 || Brian Barnes (1–1) || Pat Combs (10–10) || None || 8,985 || 75–83
|- style="background:#bfb"
| 159 || September 30 || @ Expos || 2–1 || Terry Mulholland (9–10) || Chris Nabholz (6–2) || None || 17,464 || 76–83
|-

|- style="background:#bfb"
| 160 || October 1 || Cubs || 7–6 || José DeJesús (7–8) || Kevin Coffman (0–2) || Roger McDowell (22) || 9,041 || 77–83
|- style="background:#fbb"
| 161 || October 2 || Cubs || 1–3 || Mike Bielecki (8–11) || Tommy Greene (3–3) || Mitch Williams (16) || 9,940 || 77–84
|- style="background:#fbb"
| 162 || October 3 || Cubs || 3–4 || Greg Maddux (15–15) || Chuck McElroy' (0–1) || Paul Assenmacher (10) || 11,889 || 77–85
|-

Roster

Player stats

Batting

Starters by positionNote: Pos = Position; G = Games played; AB = At bats; H = Hits; Avg. = Batting average; HR = Home runs; RBI = Runs batted inOther battersNote: G = Games played; AB = At bats; H = Hits; Avg. = Batting average; HR = Home runs; RBI = Runs batted inPitching

Starting pitchersNote: G = Games pitched; IP = Innings pitched; W = Wins; L = Losses; ERA = Earned run average; SO = StrikeoutsOther pitchersNote: G = Games pitched; IP = Innings pitched; W = Wins; L = Losses; ERA = Earned run average; SO = StrikeoutsRelief pitchersNote: G = Games pitched; W = Wins; L = Losses; SV = Saves; ERA = Earned run average; SO = Strikeouts Farm system 

Notes

References
1990 Philadelphia Phillies season at Baseball Reference''

Philadelphia Phillies seasons
Philadelphia Phillies season
Philadelphia Phillies